Engine House No. 3 is a historic fire station located in downtown Fort Wayne, Indiana.  It was designed by the architectural firm Wing & Mahurin, with the original section built in 1893 and an addition built in 1907.  It is a two-story, Romanesque Revival style red brick building. The building houses the Fort Wayne Firefighters Museum.

It was added to the National Register of Historic Places on July 27, 1979.

References

External links

Fort Wayne Firefighters Museum

Fire stations on the National Register of Historic Places in Indiana
Romanesque Revival architecture in Indiana
Fire stations completed in 1893
Museums in Fort Wayne, Indiana
National Register of Historic Places in Fort Wayne, Indiana